The 1970–71 season was Sport Lisboa e Benfica's 67th season in existence and the club's 37th consecutive season in the top flight of Portuguese football, covering the period from 1 July 1970 to 30 June 1971. Benfica competed domestically in the Primeira Divisão and the Taça de Portugal, and participated in the European Cup Winners' Cup after winning the Taça de Portugal in the previous season.

Benfica began the new season with the task of to regaining the title lost to Sporting the year before. After Otto Glória resigned and José Augusto replaced him, Benfica searched for a manager and selected Jimmy Hagan, with José Augusto as his assistant. With only António Barros as new signing, an improvement in the team was solely dependent on Hagan. In the transfer window, Mário Coluna and Humberto Fernandes departed. The season started with a win over CUF, followed by draw with Sporting. After a second home win and reaching first place, Benfica went through three weeks of consecutive draws. In November, Benfica was knocked-out of Europe and suffered consecutive away losses. Despite winning at home, Benfica had only one win on the road over the course of half a season. They sat in fourth place with a six-point deficit to Sporting. In the second part of the campaign, Benfica regained four points in two match-days, which included a 5–1 win over them. By January, Benfica closed the gap to one point, but a 4–0 loss against Porto stopped them. After a slow February; in March, Benfica caught Sporting at the front and in April, overtook them, after they lost to Porto. On 25 April, Benfica confirmed their 18th league title with Artur Jorge as Bola de Prata. Benfica concluded the season with Taça de Portugal Final, losing it to Sporting.

Season summary
Benfica started the new season with the task of improving on troubled past season, where they lost the title to Sporting and had Estádio da Luz banned for part of the season for pitch invasion. Back-to-back league winner, Otto Glória had resigned and was replaced by José Augusto for the final months of the season. Alfredo Di Stéfano was approached to replace him, but the choice fell to Englishman, Jimmy Hagan, who arrived in Lisbon on 15 April. Hagan most notorious change was his rigidity and harsh training sessions. In the transfer window, Benfica lost Mário Coluna and Humberto Fernandes, both were part of the team for over 10 years and Coluna become a club legend. The only signing for the first team was António Barros, with the youth team, bringing in Shéu. The pre-season began on 28 July with the team travelling to Luanda for a tour. After a brief period in Portugal, on 17 August, Benfica embarked on another tour, in South-east Asia, where they played seven games in roughly two weeks.
Due to the events of the past season, Benfica still had to play one game at Estádio Nacional.

The league campaign began on 13 September with home win against CUF. Three days later, Benfica faced Olimpija Ljubljana for the European Cup Winners' Cup and drew 1–1. In the first away match of the league, Benfica visited Estádio de Alvalade to play Sporting, bringing home  his second 1–1 draw of the week. For the final league match of the month, Benfica returned to Estádio da Luz after a prolonged exile. They beat Boavista by 4–0 and reached first place, levelled on points with Sporting. Mid week, Benfica played host to Olimpija Ljubljana, winning 8–1 and qualifying for the second round. In October, the club performance dipped and they went three weeks without a win. First they drew nil-nil on the road against Vitória de Guimarães, followed by a 2–2 draw in the Clássico with Porto. On 21 October, Benfica hosted Vorwärts Berlin for the Cup Winners' Cup and beat them by 2–0. Four days later, Benfica concluded their three weeks without a win for the Primeira Divisão, with a third away draw, now with Belenenses. This left Benfica in second place, three points shy of leader Sporting. In the last match of October, Benfica responded to this dark spell with a 7–0 home win against Tirsense. On the 4 November, Benfica was knocked-out of Europe by Vorwärts Berlin on penalties, after a 2–0 loss during 120 minutes. On the opening league match of the month, Benfica won away against Barreirense, their first ever away win in the season. Still, the team remained uncompetitive on the road, losing for the first time in the league on 15 November in a visit to Farense. This put Benfica in fourth place with five points less than Sporting. In the following week, a home win against Leixões, while Sporting dropped points, cut Benfica's deficit to four points. However, a double from Vítor Baptista in the visit to Vitória de Setúbal, inflicted the team their second league loss of the campaign.
Sporting had again a six-point lead over Benfica, who remained fourth. Benfica began December with a 3–0 win over Varzim and gained a point over Sporting. The first half of the season ended with an away draw against Académica de Coimbra, putting Benfica with six points less than Sporting at the turn of the season.

Benfica began the second part of the campaign with an away win over CUF. Sporting lost so Benfica regained two points, right before meeting them. In the Derby de Lisboa, Benfica received and beat Sporting by 5–1 with a hat-trick from Artur Jorge. Jimmy Hagan described the win as "Speed, goals and football, plus an amazing Vítor Damas". Benfica was now with 21 points, two less than Sporting. They kept on winning and beat Boavista by 3–0 on the road. After a tour in South America in mid January, Benfica defeated Vitória de Guimarães at home and got within a point of Sporting, after they dropped points on the same day. On 31 January, Benfica visited Estádio das Antas and was surprised by 4–0 loss. This result kept Benfica in third place and saw Sporting reopen a three–point lead. In the opening match of February, Benfica beat Belenenses at home, while Sporting drew away, resetting the gap between them at two points. In the following two match-days, all of the Big Three won, so no changes occurred at the top of the table; Benfica beat Tirsense on the road and Barreinse in Estádio da Luz. On 21 March, Benfica defeated Farense at home by 5–0 and climbed to the top of table, taking advantage of a loss from Sporting and Porto draw. The win put Sporting and Benfica level on points. Benfica closed March with an away win over Leixões, with Porto losing and dropping out of race. This left Benfica and Sporting with a three–point lead and three match-days to go. On 4 April, Benfica beat Vitória de Setúbal at home and for the first time headed the league isolated, with a two-point lead. Sporting had lost with Porto. Three weeks later, Benfica confirmed their league title with an away win over Varzim. It was their 18th league title. They finished the Primeira Divisão with a 5–1 victory over Académica, ending the campaign with a three-point lead over Sporting, having won nine points over them in half a season. Artur Jorge was Bola de Prata with 24 goals. The season concluded with Benfica and Sporting both qualifying for the Taça de Portugal Final, with Sporting winning by 4–1. It was Sporting's first ever win against Benfica in the final of the Taça de Portugal.

Competitions

Overall record

Primeira Divisão

League table

Results by round

Matches

Taça de Portugal

Quarter-finals

Semi-finals

Final

European Cup Winners' Cup

First round

Second round

Friendlies

Player statistics
The squad for the season consisted of the players listed in the tables below, as well as staff member Jimmy Hagan (manager) and José Augusto (assistant manager).

Transfers

In

Out

Out by loan

Notes

References

Bibliography
 
 
 

S.L. Benfica seasons
Benfica
Portuguese football championship-winning seasons